Below is a partial list of minor league baseball players in the St. Louis Cardinals system and rosters of their minor league affiliates.

Players

José Fermín

José Miguel Fermín (born March 29, 1999) is a Dominican professional baseball infielder in the St. Louis Cardinals organization.

Fermín signed with the Cleveland Indians as an international free agent in July 2015. He made his professional debut in 2016 with the Dominican Summer League Indians. 

On November 9, 2022, the St. Louis Cardinals acquired Fermín from the Guardians and he was added to their 40-man roster. Fermín suffered a quadriceps strain in spring training and was optioned to the Triple-A Memphis Redbirds to begin the 2023 season.

Moisés Gómez

Moisés Manuel Gómez (born August 27, 1998) is a Venezuelan professional baseball outfielder in the St. Louis Cardinals organization.

Gómez was signed by the Tampa Bay Rays as an international free agent in 2015, and spent seven years in their minor league system, making it as high as Double-A with the Montgomery Biscuits. 

Following the 2021 season, Gómez asked for his release so he could play in a winter baseball league in Venezuela. Before he could begin winter play, he was signed by the St. Louis Cardinals as a free agent. He opened the 2022 season with the Springfield Cardinals, batting .321 with 23 home runs and 54 RBIs over sixty games. He was promoted to the Memphis Redbirds in late June. Over sixty games with Memphis to end the season, he hit .266 with 16 home runs and forty RBIs. Between both teams, he finished with a combined .294 batting average with 39 home runs and 94 RBIs; his total of 39 home runs for the season led the minor leagues and he was awarded the Joe Bauman Home Run Award. 

On November 7, 2022, the Cardinals selected his contract and added him to the 40-man roster. Gómez was optioned to Triple-A Memphis to begin the 2023 season.

Gordon Graceffo

Gordon Joseph Graceffo (born March 17, 2000) is an American professional baseball pitcher in the St. Louis Cardinals organization.

Graceffo attended Cranford High School in Cranford, New Jersey and played college baseball at Villanova University. As a redshirt sophomore in 2021, he started 11 games and went 7-2 with a 1.54 ERA, 86 strikeouts, and 13 walks over 82 innings. After the season, he briefly played in the Cape Cod Baseball League for the Bourne Braves. He was selected by the St. Louis Cardinals in the fifth round of the 2021 Major League Baseball draft.

Graceffo signed and made his professional debut with the Palm Beach Cardinals of the Single-A Florida State League, going 1-0 with a 1.73 ERA and 37 strikeouts over 26 innings. He opened the 2022 season with the Peoria Chiefs of the High-A Midwest League. After eight starts in which he went 3-2 with a 0.99 ERA, 56 strikeouts, and four walks over  innings, he was promoted to the Springfield Cardinals of the Double-A Texas League. He was named the Cardinals' Minor League Pitcher of the Month for both April and May. Over 18 starts with Springfield, Graceffo posted a 7-4 record with a 3.94 ERA and 83 strikeouts over  innings.

Villanova Wildcats bio

Tink Hence

Markevian Hence (born August 6, 2002) is an American professional baseball pitcher in the St. Louis Cardinals organization.

Hence attended Watson Chapel High School in Pine Bluff, Arkansas where he played baseball. During his senior year in 2020, he pitched three innings before the season was cancelled due to the COVID-19 pandemic. He was selected by the St. Louis Cardinals with the 63rd overall selection of the 2020 Major League Baseball draft. He signed for $1.12 million, forgoing his commitment to play college baseball at the University of Arkansas. 

Hence did not play after signing with the Cardinals due to the cancellation of the minor league season. He made his professional debut in 2021 with the Florida Complex League Cardinals, pitching a total of eight innings for the season while giving up eight earned runs and three walks while striking out 14. He opened the 2022 season in extended spring training before he was assigned to the Palm Beach Cardinals in mid-May. On June 15, he pitched three innings of a combined no-hitter versus the Clearwater Threshers. Over 16 starts with Palm Beach, Hence went 0-1 with a 1.38 ERA, 81 strikeouts and 15 walks over  innings. He was selected to play in the Arizona Fall League for the Salt River Rafters after the season.

Two of Hence's older brothers, Braelin and Blake, played college baseball at the University of Arkansas at Pine Bluff.

Joseph King

Joseph Daniel King (born February 23, 2001) is an American professional baseball pitcher for the St. Louis Cardinals organization.
 
King graduated from Woodside High School in Woodside, California, in 2019. That year, he was named the baseball player of the year in the Peninsula Athletic League's Ocean Division. He attended the University of California, Berkeley and played college baseball for the California Golden Bears. The St. Louis Cardinals selected him in the ninth round of the 2022 MLB draft. He signed with the Cardinals and reported to extended spring training. He pitched for the Great Britain national baseball team in the 2023 World Baseball Classic.

Ryan Loutos

Ryan William Loutos (born January 29, 1999) is an American professional baseball pitcher in the St. Louis Cardinals organization.

Loutos attended Barrington High School in Barrington, Illinois where he played baseball and posted a 0.47 ERA and 92 strikeouts over 59 innings as senior in 2017. After high school, he enrolled at Washington University in St. Louis where he played college baseball. As a senior in 2021, he went 11-1 with a 1.33 ERA over 13 starts. Loutos went unselected in the 2021 Major League Baseball draft and signed with the St. Louis Cardinals as an undrafted free agent.

Loutos made his professional debut with the Palm Beach Cardinals, going 1-2 with a 5.56 ERA over  innings. He opened the 2022 season with the Peoria Chiefs and was promoted to the Springfield Cardinals and Memphis Redbirds during the season. Over 46 games (two starts) between the three teams, he went 3-6 with a 3.96 ERA and 72 strikeouts over  innings. He was selected to play in the Arizona Fall League for the Salt River Rafters after the season.

Washington University Bears bio

Connor Lunn

Connor Alexander Lunn (born July 8, 1998) is an American professional baseball pitcher in the St. Louis Cardinals organization.

Lunn attended Cathedral Catholic High School in San Diego, California and played college baseball at the University of Southern California. In 2018, he played collegiate summer baseball with the Wareham Gatemen of the Cape Cod Baseball League. As a junior in 2019, he pitched in 15 games and went 7-4 with a 3.69 ERA and 79 strikeouts over 83 innings, earning All-Pac-12 Conference honors. After the season, he was selected by the St. Louis Cardinals in the 11th round of the 2019 Major League Baseball draft.

Lunn signed with the Cardinals and made his professional debut with the State College Spikes with whom he posted a 1.96 ERA over  innings. He spent the 2021 season with the Peoria Chiefs and started 23 games, going 6-8 with a 3.96 ERA and 121 strikeouts over  innings. Lunn played the 2022 season with the Springfield Cardinals. Over 21 games (17 starts), he went 4-7 with a 6.61 ERA and 78 strikeouts over  innings.

USC Trojans bio

Thomas Parsons

Thomas Britton Parsons (born September 1, 1995) is an American professional baseball pitcher in the St. Louis Cardinals organization.

Parsons graduated from New Albany High School in New Albany, Ohio, in 2014. After graduating, he enrolled at Adrian College where he played college baseball. For his career, he started 44 games and compiled a 40–4 record with a 2.21 ERA, all three being program records. He was undrafted in the 2018 MLB draft and signed with the St. Louis Cardinals as an undrafted free agent.

After signing, Parsons made his professional debut that summer for the Johnson City Cardinals of the Rookie-level Appalachian League, going 5–1 with a 3.00 ERA in 13 games (nine starts), earning a spot on the All-Star team. In 2019, Parsons began the year with the Peoria Chiefs of the Class A Midwest League. He was named the Midwest League Player of the Month for April after giving up only one run in thirty innings of work. He was promoted to the Palm Beach Cardinals of the Class A-Advanced Florida State League in May, and earned another promotion to the Springfield Cardinals of the Class AA Texas League in June. In August, he made one start for the Memphis Redbirds of the Class AAA Pacific Coast League. Over 27 starts between the four clubs, Parsons went 11–9 with a 3.53 ERA, while leading the minor leagues with  innings pitched.

Parsons did not play a minor league game in 2020 due to the cancellation of the minor league season caused by the COVID-19 pandemic. For the 2021 season, he returned to Memphis, appearing in 24 games (nine starts) in which he went 2-6 with a 5.86 ERA over  innings. He returned to Memphis for the 2022 season. Over 38 games (17 starts), he posted a 12-4 record with a 4.31 ERA and 110 strikeouts over  innings.

Griffin Roberts

Griffin Daniel Roberts (born June 13, 1996) is an American professional baseball pitcher in the St. Louis Cardinals organization.

Roberts graduated from James River High School in Midlothian, Virginia. As a senior, he pitched to a 6–0 record with a 1.24 ERA. He was not selected out of high school in the 2015 Major League Baseball draft and he enrolled at Wake Forest University where he played college baseball for the Wake Forest Demon Deacons.

In 2016, as a freshman, Roberts struggled with his command. In  innings pitched that year, he walked 18 batters, threw seven wild pitches, and hit five batters while compiling a 9.19 ERA. As a sophomore in 2017, he greatly improved, and became Wake Forest's closer, finishing the year with a 2–5 record, a 2.19 ERA, and eight saves to go along with striking out 80 batters in  innings. He was named to the All-ACC Second Team.

After his sophomore year, Roberts was drafted by the Minnesota Twins in the 29th round of the 2017 Major League Baseball draft, but he did not sign and returned to Wake Forest. That same summer, he played collegiate summer baseball for the Wareham Gatemen of the Cape Cod Baseball League, and was named a league all-star. As a junior in 2018, he transitioned into a starting pitcher, and became Wake Forest's Friday night starter, going 5–4 with a 3.82 ERA while striking out an ACC-best 130 batters in  innings. He was named to the All-ACC Second Team for the second season in a row.

Roberts was selected by the St. Louis Cardinals with the 43rd overall selection in the 2018 Major League Baseball draft. Roberts agreed to terms with the Cardinals and received a $1,664,200 signing bonus. He made seven appearances for the Gulf Coast Cardinals of the Rookie-level Gulf Coast League and one appearance for the Palm Beach Cardinals of the Class A-Advanced Florida State League, pitching to a combined 5.59 ERA over  innings. After the season, he was suspended 50 games for his second positive test for a drug of abuse. Roberts was activated from his suspension on May 29, 2019, and was assigned to Palm Beach. Over 15 games (13 starts) with Palm Beach, Roberts went 1–7 with a 6.44 ERA, striking out 36 while walking 35 over  innings. He was selected to play in the Arizona Fall League for the Glendale Desert Dogs following the season.

Roberts did not play a minor league game in 2020 due to the cancellation of the minor league season caused by the COVID-19 pandemic. To begin 2021, he was assigned to the Springfield Cardinals of the Double-A Central, but appeared in only two games for the season. He split the 2022 season between the Florida Complex League Cardinals, Palm Beach, and Springfield, posting a 9.25 ERA with 37 strikeouts and 26 walks over  innings.

Wake Forest Demon Deacons bio

Jhon Torres

Jhon Hansser Torres (born March 29, 2000) is a Colombian professional baseball outfielder in the St. Louis Cardinals organization.

Torres signed with the Cleveland Indians as an international free agent in 2016. He made his professional debut that summer with the Rookie-level Dominican Summer League Indians, batting .255 with five home runs and 35 RBIs over 54 games. He began the 2017 season with the Rookie-level Arizona League Indians.

On July 31, 2018, Torres (alongside Conner Capel) was traded to the St. Louis Cardinals in exchange for Oscar Mercado. He was assigned to the Rookie-level Gulf Coast League Cardinals, with whom he finished the season. Over 44 games combined between the two teams, Torres slashed .321/.409/.525 with eight home runs and thirty RBIs. In 2019, he began the season with the Peoria Chiefs of the Class A Midwest League. However, after batting only .167 with eight RBIs over 21 games, he was reassigned to the Johnson City Cardinals of the Rookie-level Appalachian League where he hit .286/.391/.527 with six home runs and 17 RBIs over 33 games to end the year.

Torres did not play a minor league game in 2020 due to the cancellation of the minor league season caused by the COVID-19 pandemic. For the 2021 season, he returned to Peoria, now members of the High-A Central, and slashed .238/.302/.366 with six home runs, 32 RBIs, and 25 doubles over 97 games. He returned to Peoria to begin the 2022 season, but opened the year on the injured list.

Connor Thomas

Sidney Connor Thomas (born May 29, 1998) is an American professional baseball pitcher in the St. Louis Cardinals organization.

Thomas attended Tift County High School in Tifton, Georgia. As a junior in 2015, he went 8-1 with a 0.67 ERA. Unselected in the 2016 Major League Baseball draft, he enrolled at Georgia Tech where he played college baseball.

In 2017, as a freshman at Georgia Tech, Thomas pitched  innings in which he gave up 13 earned runs. As a sophomore, he moved into the starting rotation, going 7-4 with a 3.34 ERA and 106 strikeouts over 97 innings and fifteen games. In 2019, his junior year, Thomas made 16 starts in which he compiled a 9-2 record and 3.11 ERA over 113 innings. After the season, he was selected by the St. Louis Cardinals in the fifth round of the 2019 Major League Baseball draft.

Thomas signed with the Cardinals and made his professional debut with the State College Spikes of the Low-A New York–Penn League before being promoted to the Peoria Chiefs of the Single-A Midwest League in July. Over 43 innings pitched between the two clubs, he went 4-1 with a 3.77 ERA. To begin the 2021 season, he was assigned to the Springfield Cardinals of the Double-A Central. After compiling a 4.87 ERA over  innings, he was promoted to the Memphis Redbirds of the Triple-A East. Over 22 games (14 starts) with Memphis, Thomas went 6-4 with a 3.10 ERA and 92 strikeouts over  innings. Thomas returned to Memphis for the 2022 season. Over 28 games (25 starts), he posted a 6-12 record with a 5.47 ERA and 110 strikeouts over 135 innings. He was selected to play in the Arizona Fall League (AFL) for the Salt River Rafters after the season. He compiled a 1.75 ERA and 34 strikeouts over  innings and was named the AFL Pitcher of the Year. 

On November 15, 2022, the Cardinals selected his contract and added him to the 40-man roster. Thomas was optioned to Triple-A Memphis to begin the 2023 season.

Guillermo Zuñiga

Guillermo Enrique Zuñiga (born October 10, 1998) is a Colombian professional baseball pitcher in the St. Louis Cardinals organization.

Zuñiga pitched in Minor League Baseball for the Atlanta Braves organization from 2016 to 2017 and for the Los Angeles Dodgers organization from 2018 to 2022. 

On December 6, 2022, Zuniga signed a major league contract with the St. Louis Cardinals. He was optioned to the Triple-A Memphis Redbirds to begin the 2023 season.

Full Triple-A to Rookie League rosters

Triple-A

Double-A

High-A

Single-A

Rookie

Foreign Rookie

References

Minor league players
Lists of minor league baseball players